Bryan Andrew Lefley (October 18, 1948 – October 28, 1997) was a Canadian professional ice hockey player and coach. He played in 228 games in the National Hockey League between 1972 and 1978, and later played in Europe.

Lefley was born in Grosse Isle, Manitoba. After his playing days, he coached in Europe, notably coaching the Italy men's national ice hockey team from 1993–1997, until his death in a car accident on October 28, 1997 in Bolzano, Italy, ten days after his 49th birthday. Bryan was the brother of Chuck Lefley.

Career statistics

Regular season and playoffs

References

External links
 

1948 births
1997 deaths
Baltimore Clippers players
Canadian expatriate ice hockey players in Italy
Canadian ice hockey coaches
Canadian ice hockey defencemen
Colorado Rockies (NHL) players
Düsseldorfer EG players
Fort Worth Wings players
HC Varese players
Ice hockey people from Manitoba
Kansas City Scouts players
New York Islanders players
Oklahoma City Blazers (1965–1977) players
Omaha Knights (CHL) players
Providence Reds players
Road incident deaths in Italy
SC Bern coaches
Springfield Indians players
Undrafted National Hockey League players
Winnipeg Rangers players